Venitian or Venitan may refer to:
anything of or relating to Venice
the Venetian language

See also Venetian (disambiguation).